WJQZ (103.5 FM) is a radio station broadcasting a classic hits and oldies format.  Licensed to Wellsville, New York, United States, the station serves the Olean area.  The station is currently owned by DBM Communications, Inc. and features a locally programmed playlist spanning from the 1960s through the 1980s.

History
WJQZ went on the air on February 3, 1986, at a frequency of 93.5 FM. It was Allegany County's first commercial FM radio station. The station first broadcast with an operating power of 3,000 watts with its transmitter located on Madison Hill Road in Wellsville and its studios on Railroad Avenue in Wellsville. The radio station originally presented an adult contemporary music format.  The radio station was acquired on October 31, 1990, by Erin Communications, Inc. which eventually changed frequency from 93.5 to 103.5 and doubled its power. WJQZ was affiliated with ABC's Oldies Radio, and its successor network Classic Hits Radio, until that network was dissolved in the early 2010s.

References

External links

JQZ
Classic hits radio stations in the United States
Oldies radio stations in the United States
Radio stations established in 1986
1986 establishments in New York (state)